Greek Academy may refer to:
 New Academy (Moscopole), an educational institution operating from 1743 to 1769 in Moscopole
 Academy of Athens (modern), the national academy of Greece 
 Greek Army Academy, an educational institution in Greece founded in 1828 in Nafplio by Ioannis Kapodistrias
 Greek Film Academy, a professional honorary organization in Greece for filmmakers